State farm may refer to:

State Farm, a group of American insurance companies

Agriculture
 Sovkhoz, or Soviet farm, a state-owned farm in the Soviet Union and some post-Soviet states
 State Agricultural Farm, a form of collective farming in People's Republic of Poland
 Volkseigenes Gut, state-owned farm in East Germany
 Prison farm, a correctional facility where convicts work on a farm

Sports facilities
 State Farm Arena, in Atlanta, Georgia, U.S.
 State Farm Hidalgo Arena, formerly State Farm Arena, now Payne Arena, in Hidalgo, Texas, U.S.
 State Farm Center, in Champaign, Illinois, U.S.
 State Farm Stadium, in Glendale, Arizona, U.S.

See also